Jasmyne Bryanne Spencer (born August 27, 1990) is an American soccer player who plays as a forward for Angel City FC in the National Women's Soccer League (NWSL). She previously played for OL Reign, Orlando Pride, Western New York Flash and Washington Spirit in the NWSL, Sydney FC, Canberra United and Melbourne City in the Australian W-League, Cypriot side Apollon Limassol in the 2013–14 UEFA Women's Champions League, and Danish side Brøndby IF in the 2012–13 UEFA Women's Champions League.

Early life
Spencer was born and raised in Long Island, New York and attended Bay Shore High School where she played soccer and ran track. Spencer was twice-named the high school team's most valuable player and served as captain. She led the team in scoring and assists for four seasons and set a school record for career goals. She played club soccer for the Albertson Fury 90 and won three consecutive state championships with the team.

Playing career

New York Fury and Brøndby, 2012
Spencer was selected by the Philadelphia Independence during the 2012 WPS Draft; however, the league suspended operations before play began. She later joined the New York Fury in the Women's Premier Soccer League Elite. Spencer joined Danish side Brøndby IF for two matches of the 2012–13 UEFA Women's Champions League logging a total of 25 minutes.

Washington Spirit and Apollon Limassol, 2013
In 2013, Spencer signed with the Washington Spirit for the inaugural season of the NWSL. She made 17 appearances for the club. The team finished in last place during the regular season with a  record.

In September 2013, Spencer was loaned to Apollon Limassol in the Cypriot First Division. She made two appearances for the club during their 2013–14 UEFA Women's Champions League campaign and scored one goal.

Western New York Flash, 2014–15
Spencer joined the Western New York Flash ahead of the 2014 NWSL season. She made 22 appearances for the club, starting in 9 matches and scoring 3 goals. She scored her first goal for the Flash during a 2–1 over FC Kansas City on May 8. The Flash finished in seventh place with a  record.

Returning to the Flash for the 2015 season, Spencer started in 19 of the team's 20 matches. She scored a game-winning goal against the Washington Spirit, resulting in a 3–2 win. The Flash finished in seventh place with a  record.

Sydney FC, 2014–16

In September 2014, Spencer signed with Sydney FC of the Australian W-League for the 2014 season. She was a starting forward in all 13 games that she played and scored 8 goals. During her debut for the team during a match against Adelaide United, Spencer scored the game-winning brace resulting in a 2–0 win. Sydney finished in fourth place during the regular season with a  record and secured a berth to the Final Stages. The team was defeated by Perth Glory in the semi-finals. Spencer was named Players' Player of the Year by her teammates.

Returning to Sydney for the 2015–16 season, Spencer was a starting player in all 14 games in which she played and scored 4 goals during the regular season, primarily playing as a midfielder. Sydney finished in third place with a  record and advanced to the semi-finals where they faced Canberra United. During the match, Spencer scored the game-winning goal in the 67th minute to lead Sydney to a 1–0 win and berth to the 2016 W-League Grand Final.

Orlando Pride, 2016–17

In November 2015, Orlando Pride selected Spencer as their fourth pick in the 2015 NWSL Expansion Draft. During the team's inaugural season, Spencer was a starting forward in 17 of the 20 games she played. She scored her first goal for the Pride — a game-winner — during a 1–0 win over the Houston Dash on June 24. The goal was named Goal of the Week for Week 10 of the 2016 season. Two days later, she scored the team's lone goal during a 2–1 loss against Portland Thorns FC. The Pride finished their inaugural season in ninth place with a  record. Spencer scored four goals during the regular season.

Canberra United, 2016–17
Spencer joined Canberra United on loan for the 2016–17 W-League season. She was a starting player in 8 of her 10 appearances for the club, helping Canberra finish in first place during the regular season with a  record and advance to the semi-finals.

OL Reign, 2018–2020
In January 2018, Spencer was traded to OL Reign (then known as Seattle Reign FC). She made her debut for the club during the team's home opener win against the Washington Spirit. The game marked Spencer's 100th cap in the NWSL.  Spencer tore her ACL in the first game of the 2019 NWSL season and is expected to miss the totality of the season.

Melbourne City FC, 2018–19
Spencer joined Melbourne City on loan for the 2018–19 W-League season. She made her debut in City's season opener, a 2–0 loss to Canberra United but scored a hat-trick the following weekend in the team's home opener, a 3–1 victory over Sydney.

Houston Dash, 2021

Angel City FC, 2022–

References

External links

 
 
 Washington Spirit player profile
 Maryland Terrapins player profile
 

1990 births
Living people
African-American women's soccer players
American expatriate sportspeople in Australia
American expatriate sportspeople in Cyprus
American expatriate sportspeople in Denmark
American women's soccer players
Apollon Ladies F.C. players
Brøndby IF (women) players
Canberra United FC players
Expatriate women's footballers in Denmark
Expatriate women's footballers in Cyprus
Expatriate women's soccer players in Australia
Maryland Terrapins women's soccer players
National Women's Soccer League players
New York Fury players
Orlando Pride players
People from Bay Shore, New York
OL Reign players
Soccer players from New York (state)
Sportspeople from Suffolk County, New York
Sydney FC (A-League Women) players
A-League Women players
Washington Spirit players
Western New York Flash players
Women's association football forwards
Women's Premier Soccer League Elite players
21st-century African-American sportspeople
21st-century African-American women
Angel City FC players
Bay Shore High School alumni